Carloto Cotta (born 31 January 1984) is a Portuguese actor.

Career
Born in Paris, he grew up in Lisbon, and at the age of 15 he started his acting training at the Escola Profissional de Teatro de Cascais. He made his film debut in Miguel Gomes' 31 (2003). 

Since then, Cotta has been a regular presence in the Portuguese cinema. He got the attention of the critics and audiences with his lead role in the short film Arena (2009), that won the Palme d'Or at the Festival de Cannes. Carloto Cotta attained international recognition with his performance in Tabu (2012).

He is known internationally for his roles in Diamantino, Frankie, and You Won't Be Alone.

Personal life
Asked about his sexuality, Cotta has said that he doesn't appreciate sexual labels, and explained: "I don't define myself sexually. Now I'm 'one thing', and perhaps two years from now I'm 'something else'."

Filmography

Film
 2022 - You Won't Be Alone by Goran Stolevski
 2019 - Frankie by Ira Sachs
 2018 - Diamantino by Gabriel Abrantes & Daniel Schmidt
 2015 - The 1001 Nights by Miguel Gomes
 2015 - Montanha by João Salaviza
 2014 - Olvidados by Carlos Bolado
 2013 - Bairro by Jorge Cardoso, José Manuel Fernandes, Lourenço Mello, Ricardo Inácio
 2012 - Lines of Wellington by Valeria Sarmiento
 2012 - Tabu by Miguel Gomes
 2012 - Paixão by Margarida Gil
 2011 - Fratelli by Gabriel Abrantes
 2011 - Demain by Christine Laurent
 2010 - Mysteries of Lisbon by Raúl Ruiz
 2010 - Carne by Carlos Conceição
 2010 - Senhor X by  Gonçalo Galvão Teles
 2009 - To Die Like a Man by João Pedro Rodrigues
 2009 - La Religieuse Portugaise by Eugène Green
 2009 - Arena by João Salaviza
 2009 - L'Arc En Ciel by David Bonneville
 2009 - Soy un hombre sincero by Jaime Freitas
 2008 - 4 Copas by Manuel Mozos
 2008 - Nuit de Chien by Werner Schroeter
 2007 - The Golden Helmet by Jorge Cramez
 2006 - The End by Vitor Candeias
 2005 - Aqui estou eu by Jaime Freitas
 2005 - Two Drifters by João Pedro Rodrigues
 2005 - Fin de curso by Miguel Martí
 2004 - A Cara Que Mereces by Miguel Gomes 
 2003 - 31 by Miguel Gomes

Television
 2022 - Elite, Netflix
 2021 - Glória, Netflix
 2019 - A Prisioneira, TVI
 2016 - Mata Hari - Théophile Rastignac - Starmedia
 2016 - A Impostora, TVI
 2015 - Santa Bárbara TVI
 2012 - O Bairro TVI
 2010 - Laços de Sangue SIC
 2008 - Flor do Mar TVI
 2007 - Ilha dos Amores TVI
 2006 - A Minha Família  RTP
 2002 - Lusitana Paixão RTP

Theater
 2008 - The Mother, Bertolt Brecht
 2007 - Shopping and Fucking, Mark Ravenhill
 2006 - Me Cago en Dios, Ìñigo Ramirez de Haro

References

External links
 

1984 births
21st-century Portuguese male actors
French expatriates in Portugal
Golden Globes (Portugal) winners
Living people
Male actors from Lisbon
Male actors from Paris
Portuguese male film actors
Portuguese male television actors